Albert W. Alschuler is an American legal scholar best known for his work in criminal procedure and criminal law. He is the Julius Kreeger Professor Emeritus at the University of Chicago Law School. He previously taught at the University of Texas at Austin, the University of Colorado, and the University of Pennsylvania, and is known particularly for a study of plea bargaining.

Early life and education
Alschuler was born in Aurora, Illinois on September 24, 1940. His father, Sam Alschuler, was an Aurora lawyer and his mother, Winifred King Alschuler, a teacher and homemaker. He attended public schools in Aurora and graduated from Harvard College in 1962. In 1965, he graduated from the Harvard Law School where he was an officer of the Harvard Law Review.

Career
Alschuler was a law clerk to Illinois Supreme Court Justice Walter V. Schaefer and a special assistant to Fred M. Vinson, Jr., United States Assistant Attorney General in Charge of the United States Department of Justice Criminal Division. He began his academic career in 1966 as an assistant professor at the The University of Texas School of Law, and was promoted to full professor in 1969. From 1976 through 1984, he was a professor at the University of Colorado Law School. He taught briefly at the University of Pennsylvania before joining the University of Chicago Law School faculty in 1985. At Chicago, he was promoted to Wilson-Dickinson Professor in 1988 and to Julius Kreeger Professor in 2002. After taking emeritus status at Chicago in 2006, he became a professor of law at Northwestern University for five years and then retired.

Research

Plea bargaining
Alschuler's interviews with lawyers and judges in ten American cities in the 1960s led to his studies of the prosecutor's, defense attorney's, and trial judge's roles in plea bargaining. He reported that prosecutors fearing defeat at trial brought extraordinary pressure to plead guilty on defendants who might be innocent, that some defense attorneys pocketed small fees in advance and pressed nearly all of their clients to plead guilty, and that many trial judges allowed bargaining prosecutors to determine nearly all criminal sentences. Returning to the topic fifty years after his first study, he described plea bargaining as a nearly perfect device for convicting the innocent and as a major cause of mass incarceration.

Other criminal justice issues
Alschuler was an early critic of the Federal Sentencing Guidelines. He later contended that, from any coherent normative perspective, these guidelines increased sentence disparity. He described the rule barring the use of illegally obtained evidence as one of the law's success stories but called the Supreme Court's ruling in Miranda v. Arizona a failure. In a paper that received the Green Bag Exemplary Legal Writing Award, he advocated limiting corporate criminal liability, comparing it to the practice of punishing inanimate objects. Among the other subjects he addressed were racial profiling, discriminatory jury selection, police hunches, bribery standards, courtroom misconduct, preventive pretrial detention, the limits of the presidential pardon power, the ethics of the O.J. Simpson defense team, the criminality of Donald Trump, and the changing purposes of criminal punishment.

Legal history
In an award-winning work, Rediscovering Blackstone, Alschuler described the impact of Sir William Blackstone's work on American law and defended Blackstone's jurisprudence against modern critics. In Law without Values: The Life, Work, and Legacy of Justice Holmes, he examined how Holmes’ moral skepticism dominated his opinions and scholarly writings. Judge Morris B. Hoffman commended this study as "stunningly new and original."

Together with Andrew G. Deiss, Alschuler examined the history of the criminal jury in the United States, chronicling how the jury's influence on American civic life declined as its composition became more democratic. With Richard Helmholz and others, he described how the privilege against self-incrimination changed from one doctrine to another without much recognition of its sharp transformations.

Awards and honors
1975-1976 – Visiting Fellow, National Institute of Justice
1984 – Visiting Scholar, American Bar Foundation
1997 – Sutherland Prize, American Society for Legal History
1997 – Guggenheim Fellowship, John Simon Guggenheim Memorial Foundation
2000 – Exemplary Legal Writing Award, Green Bag Board of Advisors

Bibliography

Books
The Privilege against Self-Incrimination: Its Origins and Development (1997) ISBN 978-0226326603 (with R. H. Helmholz, Charles Gray, John H. Langbein, Eben Moglen & Henry Smith)
Law Without Values: The Life, Work, and Legacy of Justice Holmes (2000) ISBN 978-0226015200

Selected articles
Alschuler, A. W. (1968). The prosecutor's role in plea bargaining. The University of Chicago Law Review, 36, 50–112.
Alschuler, A. W. (1975). The defense attorney's role in plea bargaining. The Yale Law Journal, 84, 1179–1314.
Alschuler, A.W. (1976). The trial judge's role in plea bargaining. Columbia Law Review, 76, 1059–1154.
Alschuler, A. W. (1979). Plea bargaining and its history. Columbia Law Review, 79, 1-43.
Alschuler, A. W. (1983). Implementing the criminal defendant's right to trial: Alternatives to the plea bargaining system. The University of Chicago Law Review, 50, 931–1050.
Alschuler, A. W., & Deiss, A. G. (1994). A brief history of the criminal jury in the United States. The University of Chicago Law Review, 61, 867–928.
Alschuler, A. W. (2017). Miranda's fourfold failure. Boston University Law Review, 97, 849–91.
Alschuler, A. W. (2021). Plea bargaining and mass incarceration. New York University Annual Survey of American Law, 76, 205–34.

References 

Harvard College alumni
Harvard Law School alumni
University of Texas School of Law faculty
University of Colorado Law School faculty
University of Pennsylvania Law School faculty
University of Chicago Law School faculty
1940 births
Living people